The Red Prince (Ali Hassan Salameh; 1940–1979) was a Palestinian militant responsible for the 1972 Munich massacre and other terror attacks.

Red Prince may also refer to:

People
Patricio Lynch (1825–1886), Chilean sailor
Archduke Wilhelm of Austria (1895–1948), European soldier & activist
Scarlat Callimachi (1896–1975), Romanian journalist & activist
Krzysztof Mikołaj Radziwiłł (1898–1986), Polish-born politician
Souphanouvong (1909–1995), Laotian politician
Talal ibn Abd al-Aziz (1932–2018), Saudi ruling family member
Prince Moulay Hicham of Morocco (born 1964s), first cousin of King Mohammed VI and Prince Moulay Rachid

Other
 The Red Prince (film), a 1954 Austrian film
Red Prince (apple), an apple cultivar
 The Red Prince (Smith book), novel by A. J. Smith
 The Red Prince: The Secret Lives of a Habsburg Archduke, a history book by Timothy Snyder